The Wake Forest Demon Deacons college football team competes as part of the NCAA Division I Football Bowl Subdivision (FBS), representing the Wake Forest University in the Atlantic Division of the Atlantic Coast Conference (ACC). Since the establishment of the team in 1888, Wake Forest has appeared in 17 bowl games. The latest bowl occurred on December 23, 2022 with Wake Forest defeating Missouri in the 2022 Gasparilla Bowl. The Demon Deacons' overall bowl record is eleven wins and six losses.

Key

Bowl games

Notes

References
General

Specific

Wake Forest Demon Deacons

Wake Forest Demon Deacons bowl games